Radical 94 or radical dog meaning "dog" is one of the 34 Kangxi radicals (214 radicals in total) composed of 4 strokes.

In the Kangxi Dictionary, there are 444 characters (out of 49,030) to be found under this radical.

 is also the 66th indexing component in the Table of Indexing Chinese Character Components predominantly adopted by Simplified Chinese dictionaries published in mainland China, with  being its associated indexing component.

In Japanese, 犬 is a Kanji symbol, and it's Hiragana version is "いぬ".

犬 is pronounced "ēnū".

, just like most Kanji, is used in both Japanese and Chinese languages.

The symbol is pronounced "quăn" in Chinese.

Evolution

Derived characters

Literature

External links

Unihan Database - U+72AC

094
066